Sarsod  is located in Barwala tehsil of Hisar (district) district in Haryana. It is situated 21 km from Hisar city on National Highway 52 (India) which leads to Chandigarh. Sarsod is just 3 km away from Rajiv Gandhi Thermal Power Station. Barwala Tehsil is just 9 km away from Sarsod on National Highway 52 (India). Sarsod is a famous village around the Tehsil Barwala. Sarsod is a developing village. It has facilities like electricity, water, and education. Sarsod has six large ponds (Johad).

Demographics
According to the 2011 census of India, Sarsod has a population of 4630 with 2460 males and 2160 females.

Education

In the village both Private school and Government Schools are there. Sarsod having 3 Government schools and 3 Private school. Modern Sunrise School is one of the popular Private school in Barwala area. Government school for girls and boys are separate. Government school provide facilities up to 12th class.

Banks
Exclusive Branch of Punjab National Bank is situated at Sarsod. Bank is also serving all the neighbouring villages also

References

Villages in Hisar district